Kiperort is a peninsula located at the northern coast of the Gulf of Finland in Vyborgsky District of Leningrad Oblast, Russia, near the town of Primorsk, Leningrad Oblast.

See also 
 Beryozovye Islands

References 

 http://www.koivistolaiset.net/
 Poluostrova Rossii: Poluostrova Arkhangel'skoiż Oblasti, Poluostrova Kamchat·skogo Kraya, Poluostrova Karelii, Poluostrova Krasnodarskogo Kraya General Books LLC, 2011 , 9781233573615
 Seemacht in der Ostsee: Ihre Einwirkung auf die Geschichte der Ostseeländer im 17. und 18. Jahrhundert, Robert Cordes, 1907, page 437
 Baltic Pilot: The Gulf of Finland, the Aland Islands, the Aland Sea, and the Gulf of Bothnia, Hydrographic office under the authority of the secretary of the navy, 1920, page 160

Landforms of Leningrad Oblast
Peninsulas of Russia